Reamsa is a defunct Spanish plastic toy brand that was active from 1951 to 1978. The figures of this brand are representative of plastic toy soldiers that were a favorite of Spanish children in the 1960s. They are well distinguished from other similar ones because they carry the logo at the base.

History 
This small company was acquired in 1944 by two young entrepreneurs: Joan Llopart and Enric Riera. With the availability of plastic in the 1950s, the company expanded the range of its products and introduced in its catalog sanitary and household products. This then led to the figures of plastic toys decorated by hand.

Reamsa was a medium-sized business with about thirty people directly employed, but the most significant was the large number of families - several hundred - who made the miniatures painted in their private homes. Its location on Avenida Mistral very close to the Gran Vía de Barcelona, where it is traditionally placed during the week of Reyes a series of toy stalls, selling directly to the public. The quality in the design of its toys made it a success and figures were also exported.

The main part of those toy soldiers were created by the designer George Erik in the period 1960–1970, who also worked for other companies like John Hill & Company (Hilco) as well as Marx and the series "Dan Dare" of Kentoys among others. Also collaborates with Britains and Timpo in the design of the decoration of the figures.

The decoration of the figures was done in private homes.

There is a substantial hobby devoted to collecting old toy soldiers, with an abundance of small manufacturers, dealers, and toy soldier shows.

See also
Action figure
Army men
Figurine
Miniature wargaming
Model figure
Toy
Toy Soldiers

References

Toy brands
Defunct toy manufacturers
Toy soldier manufacturing companies
Model manufacturers of Spain
Militaria
Toy figurines
Traditional toys